Humayun Zaman (31 January 1936 – 17 June 2019) was a Pakistani cricketer who played first-class cricket from 1956 to 1971.

Born to Khan Bahadur Mohammad Zaman Khan, Zaman received his education at the prestigious Aitchison College. A cousin of Majid Khan and Imran Khan who bowled medium-pace and usually batted in the middle order, Humayun Zaman represented a number of teams in his career. His best bowling performance was for Punjab in a semi-final of the Quaid-e-Azam Trophy in 1957–58, when he took 4 for 69 and 5 for 32 against Karachi C, as well as top-scoring with 57 not out in the second innings. Karachi C nevertheless won easily. His highest score was 151, when he captained Lahore A against Punjab University in 1969–70.

References

External links

1936 births
2019 deaths
Cricketers from Jalandhar
Pakistani cricketers
Pakistan Universities cricketers
Lahore cricketers
Multan cricketers
Punjab (Pakistan) cricketers
Burki family